Khatunabad-e Humeh or Khatoon Abad Hoomeh may refer to:
 Khatunabad, Anbarabad
 Khatunabad-e Mohimi